This is the list of chapters from the 1998 manga Skull Man. Where appropriate, English names are on the left while the original Japanese names are on the right.

List of chapters

 PROLOGUE

References

Skull Man, The (1998 manga)